The Bacchic Cassone was a 1505-1510 panel painting by Cima da Conegliano, produced as the front panel of a decorated cassone. It is now split into four portions, one in a private collection, two in the Philadelphia Museum of Art (Bacchant and Drunken Silenus) and one in the Museo Poldi Pezzoli in Milan (Marriage of Bacchus and Ariadne).

Gallery

References

Paintings of Bacchus
Paintings by Cima da Conegliano
1510 paintings
Paintings in the collection of the Museo Poldi Pezzoli
Paintings in the collection of the Philadelphia Museum of Art